Lawrence A. Tabak (born 1951) is an American dentist and biomedical scientist serving as the acting director of the National Institutes of Health. He is the principal deputy director of the National Institutes of Health. Tabak was director of the National Institute of Dental and Craniofacial Research from 2000 to 2010.

Education 
Tabak is a native of Brooklyn, New York. He received his undergraduate degree from City College of New York, his D.D.S. from Columbia University College of Dental Medicine, and both a Ph.D. and certificate of proficiency in endodontics from the University at Buffalo. Tabak's 1981 dissertation was titled Structural and functional studies of monkey salivary mucin.

Career 
Tabak was the senior associate dean for research and professor of dentistry and biochemistry and biophysics in the University of Rochester Medical Center. He was a National Institutes of Health MERIT Award recipient, Tabak's major research focus has been on the structure, biosynthesis and function of glycoproteins. He continues work in this area, maintaining an active research laboratory within the NIH intramural program in addition to his administrative duties.

Tabak served as the director of the National Institute of Dental and Craniofacial Research from 2000 to 2010. He served as acting NIH deputy director in 2009 and was the acting director of the Division of Program Coordination, Planning, and Strategic Initiatives. Tabak succeeded Raynard S. Kington as the NIH principal deputy director in August 2010. Tabak serves as the deputy ethics counselor of the NIH. In October 2019, Tabak succeeded Ann K. Cashion as the acting director of the National Institute of Nursing Research. He was succeeded by Schwetz in January 2020.

On December 20, 2021, Tabak succeeded Francis Collins as acting director of the NIH. Tara A. Schwetz will serve in Tabak's previous role as the acting principal deputy director of the NIH.

Awards and honors 
Tabak is an elected member the National Academy of Medicine. He is a Fellow of the American Association for the Advancement of Science.

Personal life 
Tabak is married. He attended the Washington National Cathedral during the Covid-19 pandemic.

References

External links

 

21st-century American scientists
American dentistry academics
City College of New York alumni
Columbia University College of Dental Medicine alumni
Fellows of the American Association for the Advancement of Science
Living people
Members of the National Academy of Medicine
National Institutes of Health people
Place of birth missing (living people)
Scientists from Brooklyn
University at Buffalo alumni
University of Rochester faculty
1951 births
Biden administration personnel